Short Stories is a 2012 Russian mystery comedy-drama film directed by Mikhail Segal.

References

External links 

2012 films
2010s mystery comedy-drama films
Russian mystery films
Russian comedy-drama films
2010s Russian-language films